The Ruf Rt 12 is a sports car built by Ruf Automobile of Germany and based on the 997-generation Porsche 911.

Model information 

Ruf introduced the model in Autumn 2004 at the Essen Motor Show as the first of their offerings built on Porsche's then new 997 platform. Modifications include replacement of the VTG turbochargers with KKK units, a cast alloy intake manifold, gas-flowed cylinder heads, larger throttle bodies, and 102 mm Mahle pistons with custom built camshafts. The engine has a redline of 7,500 rpm.  

The Rt 12 features specially developed Ruf bodywork, giving the vehicle a unique appearance while functioning to increase downforce, improving high speed stability. Large cross-drilled brakes are included, although some debate has arisen as to how much of an upgrade the system provides over the factory-optional ceramic brakes (PCCB) that Porsche offers on "S" model 997s. Due to doubts over the PCCB system, Ruf chose not to opt them for the Rt12. In addition, Ruf replaced the factory "active" suspension system with a static system of their own design. A system with hydraulic control, developed together with Öhlins, which can raise ride-height in situations such as driveway entries is available as an option. 
The Rt12 exterior is distinguished from the standard Porsche 997 Turbo by the air tunnels on the rear haunches supplying allegedly cooler air for the twin turbochargers than the lower tunnels in the Porsche.

In total, 13 cars were made. Rear-wheel-drive was available as an option. All but two customers have ordered their Ruf Rt 12 with AWD.

Performance 

This gave it superior straight-line performance when compared to similar sports cars such as the Ferrari Enzo, Porsche Carrera GT, and Mercedes-Benz SLR McLaren. Comparable sports cars include the McLaren MP4-12C (which is faster off the line but has a slightly lower top speed.)

References

External links 
Official site for Rt 12 S and Rt 12 R
Google Video 4 minutes of Rt 12 footage, German language[Link Broken]
Pistonheads review of the Rt 12
RUF RT12 @ Bruntingthorpe [HD]

Sports cars
Coupés
Rear-engined vehicles
Rear-wheel-drive vehicles
Ruf vehicles
Cars powered by boxer engines
Cars introduced in 2004